Bubble Shooter is a clone of the Puzzle Bobble arcade game that was released by Taito in 1994.

The Bubble Shooter game and IP are owned by Ilyon Dynamics, after they were acquired from Absolutist, who released the original game in 2002. The game was ported to iOS in 2010, and was ported to Android in 2012.

In 2015, Absolutist sold the Bubble Shooter IP to Ilyon Dynamics LTD, which expanded the brand on mobile and into new platforms such as Facebook Messenger and the mobile eSports platform Skillz. A special version was developed and published with the Seminole Tribe of Florida using their Hard Rock Cafe brand.

Gameplay
The goal of the game is to clear the playing field by forming groups of three or more marbles of the same color. The game ends when the balls reach the bottom line of the screen. The more balls destroyed in one shot, the more points scored. A player wins when there are no balls remaining on the playing field.

There are 4 difficulty levels: EasyRide, Novice, Expert, Master. Two scoring modes: Classic, Sniper. The Classic Mode suggests slow-paced gameplay with no time nor shots limits. The goal of the Sniper Mode is to clear the playfield using minimum shots.

There are two game modes: 
 Strategy – Shots limit
 Arcade – Time limit

References

External links
 Bubble Shooter is for fullscreen and web site of all platforms
 Bubble Shooter HTML5 Version

2002 video games
Android (operating system) games
Casual games
Flash games
IOS games
Classic Mac OS games
Palm OS games
Single-player video games
Windows Mobile games
Video game clones
Video games developed in Ukraine